Steve Jarvis (born 1968) is a member of the North Carolina House of Representatives.

Steve Jarvis may also refer to:

Steve Jarvis Park, ground of Salisbury United Football Club
Steve Jarvis, character in Action in the North Atlantic
Stephen A. Jarvis, a UK Computer Scientist and academic